Reuben Charles Warnes (12 October 1875 – 16 January 1961) was a boxing middleweight champion who participated in the 1908 Summer Olympics. He lost the Olympic bout to Johnny Douglas. He was a member of the Gainsford Amateur Boxing Club.

Biography
He was born on 12 October 1875 in Rotherhithe in Greater London to Reuben Warnes and Harriet Emma Hockley.  Warnes married Amelia Maria Christopher on 15 February 1903 in Southwark.

He boxed in the 1908 Summer Olympics losing to Johnny Douglas.

In 1911 he and Frank Parks went to the United States with the Amateur Boxing Association of England to fight in Madison Square Garden in an international series of bouts.

He died on 16 January 1961 in Hornchurch in Greater London.

Championships
He won the Amateur Boxing Association of England middleweight championships in 1899, 1901, 1903, 1907, and 1910.

In 1936 he was a Boxing Official at the Olympic games, receiving an Official's medal from Adolf Hitler.

He was later posthumously awarded an Olympic Bronze medal from the 1908 Olympic Games, when the rules were changed to allow 4th place to gain a bronze medal.

References

Gallery

England Boxing champions
Olympic boxers of Great Britain
Boxers at the 1908 Summer Olympics
1875 births
1961 deaths
English male boxers
Middleweight boxers